The Nomina Anatomica Veterinaria (often abbreviated as NAV) is an standardized nomenclature. It is made by World Association of Veterinary Anatomists (WAVA). It is used as the standard reference for anatomical (zootomical) terminology in the field of Veterinary Science regarding domestic mammals (domestic birds are regarded in the Nomina Anatomica Avium). It is based in cats, dogs, pigs, cows, sheep, goats, rabbits and horses, being horses their main subjects.

History 
Veterinary anatomists split at the 5th International Congress of the International Anatomical Nomenclature Committee in Paris in 1955, due disagreements about the Nomina Anatomica. Following professor Clement Bressou in 1957 in Freiburg (Germany), they form the International Committee on Veterinary Anatomical Nomenclature, renamed World Association of Veterinary Anatomists in 1961, and they published the first edition of the Nomina Anatomica Veterinaria (NAV) in 1968. There have been sixth editions of the NAV, last one in 2017. The 4th edition, published in 1994, was the last commercially printed edition, fifth and sixth edition are available in pdf.

See also
 Nomina Anatomica

References

Reference works in medicine
Animal anatomy
Anatomical terminology